

This is a timeline of Nepalese history, comprising important legal and territorial changes and political events in Nepal and its predecessor states.  To read about the background to these events, see History of Nepal.  See also the list of monarchs of Nepal.

Before the common era 

 Centuries: 1st2nd3rd4th5th6th7th8th9th10th11th12th13th14th15th16th17th18th19th20th

3nd century

4th century

5th century

6th century

7th century

8th century

11th century

12th century

13th century

14th century

15th century

16th century

17th century

18th century

19th century

20th century

21st century

See also
 Timeline of Kathmandu
 Timeline of Nepalese politics

References 

Library of Congress, A Country Study: Nepal, Chronology of Important Events: online

Further reading

External links
 

{{ |date=February 2012}}
Nepalese
 
Years in Nepal
Nepal history-related lists